Baker River may refer to one of the following rivers:

In Canada:
Baker River (New Brunswick)

In Chile:
Baker River (Chile)

In the United States:
Baker River (New Hampshire)
Baker River (Washington)